Darryl Ingram (born May 2, 1966) is a former American football tight end who played in the National Football League.

Biography
Ingram was born on May 2, 1966 in Lubbock, Texas.

Career
He played for William S. Hart High School in Newhall, California.

He played at the collegiate level at the University of California, Berkeley.

Ingram was drafted by the Minnesota Vikings in the fourth round of the 1989 NFL Draft and spent his first season with the team. After a year away from the NFL, he spent the 1991 NFL season with the Cleveland Browns and the next two with the Green Bay Packers.

See also
List of Green Bay Packers players

References

People from Lubbock, Texas
Minnesota Vikings players
Cleveland Browns players
Green Bay Packers players
American football tight ends
University of California, Berkeley alumni
California Golden Bears football players
Living people
1966 births